Ostrowiec may refer to several places:

Ostrowiec, Grodno Region, a town in Western Belarus
Ostrowiec District, administrative region in Western Belarus
Ostrowiec Świętokrzyski, a town and county seat in south-central Poland
Ostrowiec County, in Świętokrzyskie Voivodeship, south-central Poland
Ostrowiec, Łódź Voivodeship (central Poland)
Ostrowiec, Lubusz Voivodeship (west Poland)
Ostrowiec, Sokołów County in Masovian Voivodeship (east-central Poland)
Ostrowiec, Myślibórz County in West Pomeranian Voivodeship (north-west Poland)
Ostrowiec, Sławno County in West Pomeranian Voivodeship (north-west Poland)
Ostrowiec, Wałcz County in West Pomeranian Voivodeship (north-west Poland)

Ostrówiec may refer to several places:
Ostrówiec, Greater Poland Voivodeship (west-central Poland)
Ostrówiec, Masovian Voivodeship (east-central Poland)